Phenopicolinic acid is a dopamine beta hydroxylase inhibitor.

References

Pyridines
Carboxylic acids
Phenols